Kaffa may refer to:
Kaffa (city) or Theodosia, a Crimean city
Kaffa Province, a former province in Ethiopia
Kingdom of Kaffa, an ancient kingdom of the Kafficho people

See also
Caffa (disambiguation)
Kafficho people, an ethnic group in the Southern Nations, Nationalities, and Peoples' Region, Ethiopia